Earl of Beverley, in the County of York, is a title in the Peerage of Great Britain, held by the Duke of Northumberland since 1865. It was created in 1790 for Algernon Percy, 2nd Baron Lovaine. He was the second son of Hugh Percy, 1st Duke of Northumberland. The title of Baron Lovaine, of Alnwick in the County of Northumberland, had been created in the Peerage of Great Britain in 1784 for the first Duke of Northumberland, with a special remainder to his second son, the aforementioned Algernon, who succeeded in the barony on his father's death in 1786. Lord Beverley was succeeded by his son, George, the 2nd Earl, who in 1865 inherited the dukedom of Northumberland from his cousin, the 4th Duke. All three titles have remained united since.

The Honourable Algernon Percy, second son of the first Earl, was a minor diplomat. The Right Reverend the Honourable Hugh Percy, third son of the first Earl, was Bishop of Rochester and of Carlisle. The Honourable Josceline Percy, fourth son of the first Earl, was a vice-admiral in the Royal Navy. The Honourable William Henry Percy, sixth son of the first Earl, was a naval officer and politician.

Lords Lovaine (1784)
Hugh Percy, 1st Duke of Northumberland, 1st Baron Lovaine (1714–1786)
Algernon Percy, 2nd Baron Lovaine (1750–1830) (created Earl of Beverley in 1790)

Earls of Beverley (1790)
Algernon Percy, 1st Earl of Beverley (1750–1830)
George Percy, 2nd Earl of Beverley (1778–1867) (succeeded as Duke of Northumberland in 1865)

For further succession, see Duke of Northumberland.

References

Percy family
Earldoms in the Peerage of Great Britain
Noble titles created in 1790